Julien Delbouis (born 14 August 1998) is a French rugby union player. His usual position is as center or wing, and he currently plays for Stade Français in the Top 14.

Honours

International 
 France (U20)
Six Nations Under 20s Championship winners: 2018
World Rugby Under 20 Championship winners: 2019

References

External links
ESPN Profile

1999 births
Living people
Stade Français players
Rugby union centres
French rugby union players